Consort Xi (4 October 1842 – 26 June 1877), of the Manchu Plain Yellow Banner Cahala clan, was a consort of Xianfeng Emperor.

Life

Family background 
Consort Xi was a booi aha of Manchu Plain Yellow Banner Cahala clan. Her personal name was Haitangchun (literally: Spring Begonia).

Father: Changshun, a cook in the Ministry of Internal Affairs (厨师).

Daoguang era 

Consort Xi was born on 4 October 1842.

Xianfeng era 
Haitangchun was one of the palace maids of Empress Dowager Cixi living in Changchun palace in the Forbidden City. In 1855, she was promoted to “Noble Lady Xi" (禧贵人，'xi' meaning "auspicious"). She formed a clique called "Four Spring Ladies" (娘娘) together with Noble Lady Lu, Noble Lady Ji and Noble Lady Qing. The name of the group corresponded personal names of ladies containing character "chun" (spring). In 1861, she was promoted to "Concubine Xi", but the promotion ceremony was held during Tongzhi era.

Tongzhi era 
In 1874, lady Cahala was promoted to "Consort Xi".

Guangxu era 
Cahala Haitangchun died on 26 June 1877. She was interred at the Ding Mausoleum in the Eastern Qing tombs.

Titles
 During the reign of the Daoguang Emperor (r. 1820–1850):
 Lady Cahala (from 4 October 1842)
 During the reign of the Xianfeng Emperor (r. 1850–1861):
 Noble Lady Xi (from 1855), sixth rank consort 
 Concubine Xi (from 1861), fifth rank consort 
 During the reign of the Tongzhi Emperor (r. 1861–1875):
 Consort Xi (from 1874), fourth rank consort

See also
 Ranks of imperial consorts in China#Qing
 Royal and noble ranks of the Qing dynasty

References 

Consorts of the Xianfeng Emperor
1842 births
1877 deaths